This is a list of the main association football rivalries in Turkey.

City derbies
 Adana derby: Adanaspor vs. Adana Demir
 Ankara derby: Gençlerbirliği vs. Ankaragücü
Istanbul derbies:
 The Big Three derbies:
 Intercontinental Derby: Fenerbahçe vs. Galatasaray S.K.
 Beşiktaş–Fenerbahçe rivalry: Beşiktaş vs. Fenerbahçe
 Beşiktaş–Galatasaray rivalry: Beşiktaş vs. Galatasaray S.K.
 Golden Horn derby: Kasımpaşa SK vs. Fatih Karagümrük
 East Istanbul derby: Kartalspor vs. Pendikspor
 Beyoğlu derby: Galatasaray vs. Kasımpaşa
 Izmir derbies:
 Big Izmir rivalry: Göztepe vs. Karşıyaka
 Capital derby: Göztepe vs. Altay
 Old derby: Karşıyaka vs. Altay
 Outskirts derby: Karşıyaka vs. Bucaspor

Provincial derbies
 Antalya derby: Alanyaspor vs. Antalyaspor
 Aydın derby: Aydınspor vs. Nazilli Belediyespor
 Balıkesir derby: Balıkesirspor vs. Bandırmaspor
 Kocaeli derby: Kocaelispor vs. Gebzespor
 Manisa derby: Akhisar Belediyespor vs. Turgutluspor
 Mersin derby: Mersin İdman Yurdu vs. Tarsus İdman Yurdu

Regional derbies
 Black Sea derbies:
 Old derby: Trabzonspor vs. Samsunspor
 East derby: Trabzonspor vs. Çaykur Rizespor
 West derby: Orduspor vs. Giresunspor
 Central Anatolia Derby: Kayserispor vs. Sivasspor
 Çukurova derbies:
 Mersin İdman Yurdu vs. Adanaspor
 Mersin İdman Yurdu vs. Adana Demirspor
 East derbies:
 Malatyaspor vs. Elazığspor
 Elazığspor vs. Diyarbakırspor
 Malatyaspor vs. Diyarbakırspor
 East Marmara derbies
 Bursaspor vs. Eskişehirspor
 Kocaelispor vs. Sakaryaspor
 Thrace derbies
 Edirnespor vs. Tekirdağspor

Non-geographic rivalries 

 As the most decorated football team outside Istanbul, Trabzonspor has rivalries with three Istanbulite clubs, Beşiktaş, Fenerbahçe and Galatasaray, however Fenerbahçe - Trabzonspor rivalry is the fiercest.
 Galatasaray vs. Çaykur Rizespor
 Beşiktaş vs. Bursaspor
 Beşiktaş vs. Göztepe
 Beşiktaş vs. Ankaragücü

Other 
: A football match between workers of TEKEL rakı and wine factories located at Bayraklı district of Izmir.

References

Football in Turkey